Dalma Špitzerová (née Holanová;  5 February 1925 - 21 January 2021) was a Slovakian actress and acting teacher. She grew up with her father, mother, and four siblings in Liptovský Mikuláš. In 1942, when she was 16, she fled to Hungary seeking refuge from deportation to concentration camps. When she was caught in Hungary she was sent to Nováky Assembly Camp, where she developed a passion for theater and acting. Following the end of the war, Špitzerová went onto become an actress in multiple theaters in Slovakia. Špitzerová was also the Slovakia winner of the 2019 Memory of Nations Awards.

Childhood 
Špitzerová was born in the Slovakian town of Piešt'any (former Czechoslovakia). She spent her whole childhood in Liptovský Mikuláš. Her father worked as a Hazzan in different synagogues, and her mother taught French and German. In 1942, her father was concerned that the family would be deported to a concentration or work camp, so he arranged for Špitzerová and her two older sisters to go to Hungary.

Escape to Hungary 
Špitzerová's two older sisters left ahead of her to go to Hungary. When it was time for Špitzerová to leave, her father's friend went with her and helped her get across the border through Rožňava. They had relatives there, but when she got to her aunt's house she wouldn't let her stay because she was afraid of being killed for hiding her. Her aunt gave her cousin money to take her to Budapest. Her cousin bought her a first-class ticket and put her on a train to Budapest.

Špitzerová did not know how to speak any Hungarian; the only thing she could say was, "I am very sleepy and very tired." She used this single phrase to ensure people didn't talk to her, but there was an instance on the train where there were police officers checking papers. She didn't have any papers, but sitting next to her was a lady that possessed wealth. The lady got upset at the police officers for having the audacity to ask for her papers, and they moved on to the next car without asking Špitzerová for her papers. This saved her.

When she arrived in Budapest, she found accommodation and a job. She was also able to reconnect with her sisters. Shortly after they arrived, her sisters were caught by Hungarian Dalmatian Gendarmes. Špitzerová was safe, because her fake documentation was different, but she didn't want to be left alone so she turned herself in with her sisters. Her sisters were sent to Auschwitz, but Špitzerová was temporarily put in a local prison in Uzhhorod. With the help of a Slovak guard, she was able to be deported to a camp in Slovakia.

Nováky Assembly Camp 
Špitzerová was in Nováky Assembly Camp for two years. She worked as a seamstress in one of the workshops making backpacks. From March to October 1942, the camps in Slovakia exported around 5,600 people to concentration camps in Poland. Špitzerová was never transported to a camp in Poland because a Czech architect was in charge of the work camp and informed the German soldiers that he needed the labor. They sewed backpacks for 10 hours a day and were given limited food.

In the prisoners' free time they would perform plays on Saturday and Sunday evenings. There was a director in the camp that was from Hungary and he would help put the plays on. Špitzerová described the performances in the camp, saying, 
"We were in the shadow of death every day in the camp. We didn't know what awaited us, whether they would send us somewhere or not. We fell asleep every night feeling we didn't know if we would survive the next day. That's why we started playing theater. My fellow prisoners told me that I had talent and that if the world returned to normal, let me try to be an actress. It kept me alive. It was something that helped me, so as not to go crazy."
The first play that she performed in was a play by Karel Čapek, The Makropulos Affair. Even though the director was hesitant to give her the part, she played Emilia Marty. The director found her very talented, along with everyone else in the camp.

During her time at the camp, Špitzerová became involved in the underground Slovak National Uprising movement. Her future husband, Juraj Špitzer, was a famous journalist and the leader of the uprising. She had known him as a child but was not romantically involved with him until meeting him again in the 3rd barracks of the camp. Špitzer used to sneak out of the camp at night with a group of people and smuggle in weapons that they had been given from Soviet Guerillas. In August 1944, the uprising against the guards began, but Špitzer would not let Špitzerová be a part of it because she was a woman. Once she escaped from the camp following the start of the uprising, she still found ways to get involved in the movement.

Role in the Slovak National Uprising
When Špitzerová got out of Nováky Assembly Camp she went to Banská Bystrice where she joined the resistance. She served as a secretariat and was sent to L'upča Castle, but she didn't like it there. She would give food to some of the Germans that had been locked up there that had kids. She felt bad for them because the Communists would shoot them ruthlessly without a fair trial. After that, she moved to the press department of the partisan movement. She was in charge of photo documentation. When they were pushed into the mountain Prašivá by the German forces she moved with them. In order to go with them, she had to dress as a boy. Her fellow Guerillas believed she was a boy until her cover was blown, but they accepted her after as a girl. She stayed with them at the mountain until she became very ill, then the doctor ordered her to ascend back down the mountain so she wouldn't die. Another girl that was in the mountains helped her get back down to safety.

In hiding 
When she was done working as a Guerilla, she had to go into hiding. She changed her name to Marta Stanková during that time and lived with a lady in Paludzka. The lady owned a shop and a pub, so Špitzerová served in the pub. The Palujas, the town people, knew who she was because she had grown up nearby, but they did not turn her in. This in part may have been because the town was an evangelical community.

Špitzerová lived in the basement of the house she was hiding in, but there were Germans who lived on the upper level of the building. There was also a German commander that used to have her help with translation because she spoke German well. One week before the end of the war, her parents and younger siblings were being led to the Soviet front of the war to safety, but a family friend turned them in to the Nazis. While they were hiding in the mountains, the man that was supposed to be helping them turned them in and then robbed them. They were killed with almost 50 other people. Špitzerová was nearby at the time of their deaths but the people of the town did not tell her right away because they did not want her to die by suicide. When she found out about her family, she felt as if she was going to have a heart attack so a German doctor sedated her.

Life following the war 
When the war was over Špitzerová wanted to move to Bratislava, but she didn't have any money. In order to earn some money, Špitzerová returned to her family home in an attempt to sell off their furniture, but the furniture had already been sold off by the lady she had been hiding with. She had sold mostly everything in the house and kept it as her reward for hiding Špitzerová. The only thing left was the curtains, which Špitzerová sold and made barely enough money for a one-way ticket to Bratislava.

When she made it to the capital of Slovakia, she was reunited with her two older sisters who had survived Auschwitz and the death march. She also tried to find Juraj Špitzer, who people had said was dead. He was still alive, but his whole family had been killed in the war and he was not in a good mental state, so he did not want to be with Špitzerová.

Acting career 
Following the war, Špitzerová graduated from the Drama Academy. The first theater she worked in was the Martin Chamber Theater, then she worked at the Nová Scéna. The last theater she worked at was the famous Tatra Revue as an actress, singer, and dancer in the 1960s. She worked with František Dibarbora at the Nová Scéna and with Milan Lasica at the Tatra Revue. In the early 70s, the Tatra Revue was shut down by the Communists.

Alexander Mach 
In the late 1960s, Špitzerová was approached by the former Minister of the Interior of the Wartime State, Alexander Mach. He had been let go in May 1968. Mach had read Juraj Špitzer's articles in Cultural Life and wanted a meeting with him. At this point, Špitzerová was back together with Špitzer and helped Mach set up a meeting with him. Špitzer and Mach released a conversation that showed two people that were enemies and had different views talking things out.

Life during communism 
After the normalization period in 1968, Špitzerová was not able to act. Her husband was also not able to work as a journalist either. The Communists did not like the ideas that he was publishing, so they silenced him.

She worked packing books at a wholesale place for a while. She then obtained a job as a direction assistant for Slovak Television. She worked for Slovak Television for 11 years, but was then fired without a reason. Špitzerová never joined the Communist party because she was raised by her father to believe in democracy

Life after communism 
In the early 90s, after the fall of Communism, Špitzerová started her own private acting studio. She used the experience she had gained to teach people how to act. She had many actors and actresses go on to become successful, including Tána Pauhofová. Teaching young actors and actresses and traveling with them to competitions satisfied her. Špitzerová said about herself, "It probably helped me in my life that I had a strong will and I never stopped believing that the bad one would go away one day".

Awards and recognitions 
Špitzerová has received multiple awards and recognitions over the past 30 years. In the 1990s, she received a 1st place international prize for her private acting studio that she started. In January 2016, she received the highest state distinction from Slovakian President Andrej Kiska. She was also featured in the 2017 documentary Zachor ("Remember" in Hebrew) that uses testimony from five ex-prisoners of Nováky Assembly Camp. The director's goal for the film was to ensure that people don't forget the Slovak work camps.

Špitzerová's most recent honor was being recognized as the 2019 Slovakian winner of the Memory of Nations Awards in Prague, Czech Republic. The 2019 awards honored a citizen in the Czech Republic, Slovakia, Poland, Hungary, and Germany that had shown bravery standing up to the totalitarian regimes in their individual countries.

References 

1925 births
2021 deaths
Holocaust survivors
Slovak actresses
Slovak Jews
People from Piešťany